Vladimir Dolganov (born 15 March 1947) is a Russian cross-country skier. He competed in the men's 30 kilometre event at the 1972 Winter Olympics.

References

External links
 

1947 births
Living people
Russian male cross-country skiers
Olympic cross-country skiers of the Soviet Union
Cross-country skiers at the 1972 Winter Olympics